The Good German is a 2006 American neo-noir crime film. A film adaptation of Joseph Kanon's  2001 novel of the same name,  it was directed by Steven Soderbergh, and stars George Clooney, Cate Blanchett, and Tobey Maguire. Set in Berlin following the Allied victory over the Nazis, it begins as a murder mystery but weaves in elements involving the American postwar employment of Nazi rocket scientists in Operation Paperclip.

The film was shot in black-and-white and is designed to imitate the appearance of film noir from the 1940s, although it also includes material – such as sex scenes and swearing – that would have been prohibited by the Production Code. Its poster is a homage to the poster for the classic film Casablanca (1942, also a Warner Bros. film), as is the closing scene at an airport. The DVD release presents the film in the 1.33:1 aspect ratio which declined in use from about 1953, though the theatrical release, and other DVD Releases, used the slightly more modern but still unusual 1.66:1 ratio.

The film received mixed reviews and grossed $5.9 million worldwide against a budget of $32 million.

Plot
Jacob "Jake" Geismer, an American war correspondent for The New Republic, returns to Berlin during the Potsdam negotiations between the Allied powers after World War II was over in Europe (May 1945) but before hostilities ended in Asia (August 1945). Jacob witnesses his murdered driver, a black-marketeering American soldier named Tully, being fished from a river eddy, suspiciously adjacent to the Potsdam conference grounds. The corpse is discovered to be in possession of 50,000 German reichsmarks — which are later revealed to have been printed by the U.S occupying forces.

Geismer becomes entwined in both the mystery of his murdered driver and the clandestine search by both Soviet and American forces for the missing German Emil Brandt. He becomes more involved in both mysteries as his investigation intersects with his search for Lena Brandt, a Jew — and Emil's wife — with whom Geismer had been in a relationship during his first stint as a journalist in pre-war Berlin. Lena has survived the Holocaust by doing "what she had to" to stay alive — early in the film this is assumed to be prostitution, but Lena (based loosely on the Jewish collaborator Stella Goldschlag) is later revealed to be secretly complicit in the deportation of her fellow Jews.

In the film, Emil Brandt is a former SS officer who had been the secretary of Franz Bettmann, Chief Production Engineer of the V-2 rocket at concentration camp Mittelbau-Dora/Mittelwerk. (Bettmann is only a minor character in the film; he appears to be based on the real Arthur Rudolph.) The Soviets, the Americans, and the British all try to get hold of Emil Brandt, for different reasons. The Americans have already detained Bettmann in a safehouse and intend to transport him to the U.S. as part of their Operation Overcast/Paperclip to have him work on their own rocket program (cf. Wernher von Braun). In the film, they are fully aware of Bettmann's role at Camp Dora and know about the slave labor used in the V-2 program, but want to cover up his involvement (because they could not lawfully employ a known war criminal), which includes eliminating Emil Brandt, whose testimony or written notes would prevent their whitewashing of Bettmann.

Geismer, in his attempts to get his former lover, Lena, out of Berlin, gets more and more involved in the search for Emil Brandt. At one point, Lena gives Emil's notes on Camp Dora to Geismer. When Lena and Geismer try to hand Emil Brandt over to the American prosecutor charged with handling war crimes cases, they are intercepted by the American authorities who want to protect Bettmann, and Brandt is murdered. But Geismer still has Brandt's notebooks, which he now trades in to the war crimes investigators of the U.S. Army (who have turned out to be in league with the other American authorities — the ones who want to keep that evidence confidential to whitewash Bettmann) in exchange for a Persilschein (a denazification document) and a visa for Lena, such that she can leave Germany.

Through a minor character of a Jewish owner of a pawn shop who survived the Holocaust with his legs amputated, the film refers to the Nazi human experimentation, in particular to bone transplantation experiments as they were done at the Ravensbrück concentration camp.

Cast
George Clooney as Captain Jacob "Jake" Geismer
Cate Blanchett as Lena Brandt
Tobey Maguire as Corporal Patrick Tully
Beau Bridges as Colonel Muller
Tony Curran as Danny
Leland Orser as Captain Bernie Teitel
Jack Thompson as Congressman Breimer
Robin Weigert as Hannelore
Ravil Isyanov as General Sikorski
Dave Power as Lieutenant Hasso Schaeffer
Christian Oliver as Emil Brandt

Production

The film imitates the appearance of films from Classical Hollywood studio-era. Most of the scenes were shot on soundstages and on Universal Studios' backlot, and were then edited with archival Russian footage and archived film from Corbis. Although the finished film is in black and white, it was shot in color because this allowed the use of faster film than available black-and-white film stocks, and afforded the ability to use 'green screen' techniques. The color was then reduced in post-production through the use of a digital intermediate to a grainier black and white, in order to blend with the carefully restored archival material.

Unlike modern films that are shot with significant "coverage" and mostly with close-ups or two shots, The Good German was shot with 1940s era wide angle lenses, such as a 32 mm, with deep focus, "strongly accented camera angles" and entire scenes staged. Director Steven Soderbergh said:

The set lighting was entirely incandescent and the audio was recorded on a boom mike instead of the more modern body mikes or automated dialogue replacement  (ADR). These decisions, combined with the limited coverage, allowed the rough cut to be produced in two days after wrapping up filming.

Title and theme
"Good Germans" is a term referring to German citizens during and after World War II who claimed not to have supported the Nazi regime, but remained silent and did not resist in a meaningful way. In addition, the title is an allusion to the phrase common among soldiers of the Allied Powers during the invasion of Europe after D-Day, that "The only good German is a dead German" — and the consequences of this death are seed for all that follows in the story of the film. Thematically, the film centers on guilt, and whether it is possible to survive the atrocities while being unaware of and not complicit in them.

Reception

Critical response
The Good German received generally mixed reviews, with many critics complaining that it was too reliant on style and did not concentrate on the building of characters. , the film holds a 34% approval rating on Rotten Tomatoes, based on 153 reviews with an average rating of 5.04/10. The site's consensus states: "Though Steven Soderbergh succeeds in emulating the glossy look of 1940s noirs, The Good German ultimately ends up as a self-conscious exercise in style that forgets to develop compelling characters." On Metacritic, the film has an average score of 49 out of 100 based on 34 reviews, indicating "mixed or average reviews".

Peter Travers of Rolling Stone greatly appreciated the film.

Box-office
The film made $76,817 in its opening weekend in five US theaters. It had a worldwide gross of $5,914,908, of which $1,308,696 was in the US, against a $32 million budget.

Awards and nominations
The film was nominated for the Berlin International Film Festival Golden Bear and received an Academy Award nomination for Best Original Score.

References

External links

 Filmscholar David Bordwell on studio films and what they might mean for The Good German: Not Back to the Future, but Ahead to the Past & Cutting remarks: On THE GOOD GERMAN, Classical Style, and the Police Tactical Unit

2006 films
2000s mystery films
American black-and-white films
American neo-noir films
Cold War films
Films about war correspondents
Films based on American novels
Films directed by Steven Soderbergh
Films produced by Gregory Jacobs
Films scored by Thomas Newman
Films set in 1945
Films set in Berlin
Films shot in Los Angeles County, California
Films with screenplays by Paul Attanasio
Warner Bros. films
2000s English-language films
2000s American films